State Highway 125 (SH 125) is a state highway in the U.S. state of Texas maintained by the Texas Department of Transportation (TxDOT). The  highway begins at the New Mexico state line southwest of Bledsoe, and passes through Bledsoe where it turns east intersecting  SH 214 before terminating at  SH 114. The highway is located entirely within Cochran County, and is numerically continuous with New Mexico State Road 125 which it meets at the state line and connects the highway to Tatum, NM. The highway has brief concurrencies with SH 214 in Lehman and Farm to Market Road 1780 in Whiteface.

The highway's numerical designation was previously assigned to a roadway in southeast Texas during the 1920s and 1930s. The current highway was designated in 1990 over a portion of  FM 769, but FM 769 had been unofficially signed as SH 125 since the 1950s. The connection New Mexico Highway was NM 294.

Route description
SH 125 begins where it meets NM 125 at the New Mexico state line. The route proceeds to the northeast almost immediately intersecting from the south FM 769 which runs closely parallel to the state line on the Texas side. SH 125 continues to the northeast to Bledsoe where the route intersects  FM 2182 before turning east along Third Street. The route intersects  FM 595 before leaving Bledsoe and then intersects  FM 1169 and  FM 1779 between Bledsoe and Lehman.

In Lehman, the route joins SH 214 to the south for a short distance before turning east again. Beyond Lehman, the road intersects  FM 2195 before gradually turning to the southeast toward Whiteface. The route enters Whiteface along East Second Street and turns north along North Taylor Street where SH 125 joins  FM 1780. On the northern edge of Whiteface, SH 125 ends at SH 114.

SH 125 passes through mostly agricultural lands and oil and gas fields across the largely flat and featureless terrain of the Llano Estacado.

History
SH 125 was previously designated on September 7, 1927 on a route from Anahuac to Beaumont in Chambers and Jefferson counties. On December 16, 1929, another split was added from Stowell through High Island to Galveston. On March 19, 1930, the route from Stowell to Galveston was renumbered as SH 124, and SH 125 had only the original section left. The former route designation was replaced on September 26, 1939 by SH 73-T between Anahuac and Stowell and by SH 124 between Stowell and Beaumont. SH 73-T was replaced by  SH 65 on November 30, 1961.

The current route was originally designated as FM 769 between SH 214 in Lehman and  SH 290, now SH 114 in Whiteface on November 18, 1947. That route was extended to the New Mexico state line on April 1, 1948, while also being extended  southward from Whiteface to an intersection with a road that on July 14, 1949 would become  FM 301 On December 17, 1952, FM 769 was extended southward  along the New Mexico state line.

The route was first unofficially signed as SH 125 while officially maintaining its Farm to Market designation on March 30, 1955 allowing the route to be numerically continuous with its New Mexico counterpart, which was renumbered from NM 294 to NM 125 that day. On November 2, 1955, the portion of the route from FM 301 to  SH 116 as the current SH 114 was designated between 1955 and 1978 was designated as an extension to FM 1780 with FM 769 ending where it intersected FM 1780. FM 1077 was renumbered as part of  US 82 on December 16, 1963. FM 1077 has since been reassigned as RM 1077 to a route in Bandera County. FM 769 was extended  farther south along the state line to  US 83 west of Denver City on January 26, 1969.

The state highway designation became official on August 29, 1990, and the FM 769 designation was eliminated. On May 7, 1991, SH 125 was reassigned along its current alignment from the state line to SH 114 in Whiteface, and FM 769 was recreated along the state line from US 83 to SH 125.

Major intersections

See also

References

125
Transportation in Cochran County, Texas